Cosmopolitan (stylized in all caps) is an American monthly fashion and entertainment magazine for women, first published based in New York City in March 1886 as a family magazine; it was later transformed into a literary magazine and, since 1965, has become a women's magazine. Cosmopolitan is one of the best-selling magazines and is directed mainly towards a female audience. Jessica Pels is the magazine's current editor-in-chief.

Formerly titled The Cosmopolitan and often referred to as Cosmo, throughout the years, Cosmopolitan has adapted its style and content. Its current incarnation was originally marketed as a woman's fashion magazine with articles on home, family, and cooking. Eventually, editor-in-chief Helen Gurley Brown changed its attention to more of a women empowerment magazine. Nowadays, its content includes articles discussing relationships, sex, health, careers, self-improvement, celebrities, fashion, horoscopes, and beauty.

Cosmopolitan is published by New York City-based Hearst Corporation. The fashion magazines are located in the Hearst Tower, 300 West 57th Street or 959 Eighth Avenue, near Columbus Circle, Midtown Manhattan, neighborhood of Manhattan in New York City and market magazines are located in the 32 Avenue of the Americas, 32 Sixth Avenue, Tribeca, neighborhood of Manhattan in New York City. Cosmopolitan has 64 international editions, including, Australia, Bulgaria, Croatia, Estonia, Finland, France, Germany, Greece, Hungary, Latin America, Malaysia, the Middle East, the Netherlands, Norway, Portugal, Romania, Russia, Serbia, Singapore, South Africa, Spain, Sweden, and the United Kingdom and is printed in 35 different languages and distributed in over 110 countries.

History

Cosmopolitan originally began as a family and women's magazine, first published based in New York City in March 1886 by Schlicht & Field of New York as The Cosmopolitan. 

Paul Schlicht told his first-issue readers inside of the front cover that his publication was a "first-class family magazine", then adding, "There will be a department devoted exclusively to the concerns of women, with articles on fashions, on household decoration, on cooking, and the care and management of children, etc. There was also a department for the younger members of the family."

Cosmopolitan circulation reached 25,000 that year, but by November 1888, Schlicht & Field were no longer in business. Ownership was acquired by John Brisben Walker in 1889. That same year, he dispatched Elizabeth Bisland on a race around the world against Nellie Bly to draw attention to the magazine.

Under John Brisben Walker's ownership, E. D. Walker, formerly with Harper's Monthly, took over as the new editor, introducing color illustrations, serials and book reviews. It became a leading market for fiction, featuring such authors as Annie Besant, Ambrose Bierce, Willa Cather, Theodore Dreiser, Rudyard Kipling, Jack London, Edith Wharton, and H.G. Wells. The magazine's press run climbed to 100,000 by 1892.

In 1897, Cosmopolitan announced plans for a free correspondence school: "No charge of any kind will be made to the student. All expenses for the present will be borne by the Cosmopolitan. No conditions, except a pledge of a given number of hours of study." When 20,000 immediately signed up, Walker could not fund the school and students were then asked to contribute 20 dollars a year. Also in 1897, H. G. Wells' The War of the Worlds was serialized, as was his The First Men in the Moon (1900). Olive Schreiner contributed a lengthy two-part article about the Boer War in the September and October issues of 1900.

In 1905, William Randolph Hearst purchased the magazine for US$400,000 and brought in journalist Charles Edward Russell, who contributed a series of investigative articles, including "The Growth of Caste in America" (March 1907), "At the Throat of the Republic" (December 1907 – March 1908) and "What Are You Going to Do About It?" (July 1910 – January 1911).

Other contributors during this period included O. Henry, A. J. Cronin, Alfred Henry Lewis, Bruno Lessing, Sinclair Lewis, O. O. McIntyre, David Graham Phillips, George Bernard Shaw, Upton Sinclair, and Ida Tarbell. Jack London's novella, "The Red One", was published in the October 1918 issue (two years after London's death), and a constant presence from 1910 to 1918 was Arthur B. Reeve, with 82 stories featuring Craig Kennedy, the "scientific detective". Magazine illustrators included Francis Attwood, Dean Cornwell, Harrison Fisher, and James Montgomery Flagg.

Hearst formed Cosmopolitan Productions (also known as Cosmopolitan Pictures), a film company based in New York City from 1918 to 1923, then Hollywood until 1938. The vision for this film company was to make films from stories published in the magazine.

Cosmopolitan magazine was officially titled as Hearst's International Combined with Cosmopolitan from 1925 until 1952, but was simply referred to as Cosmopolitan. In 1911, Hearst had bought a middling monthly magazine called World To-Day and renamed it Hearst's Magazine in April 1912. In June 1914 it was shortened to Hearst's and was ultimately titled Hearst's International in May 1922. In order to spare serious cutbacks at San Simeon, Hearst merged the magazine Hearst's International with Cosmopolitan effective March 1925. But while the Cosmopolitan title on the cover remained at a typeface of eight-four points, over time span the typeface of the Hearst's International decreased to thirty-six points and then to a barely legible twelve points. After Hearst died in 1951, the Hearst's International disappeared from the magazine cover altogether in April 1952.

With a circulation of 1,700,000 in the 1930s, Cosmopolitan had an advertising income of $5,000,000. Emphasizing fiction in the 1940s, it was subtitled The Four-Book Magazine since the first section had one novelette, six or eight short stories, two serials, six to eight articles and eight or nine special features, while the other three sections featured two novels and a digest of current non-fiction books. During World War II, sales peaked at 2,000,000.

The magazine began to run less fiction during the 1950s. Circulation dropped to slightly over a million by 1955, a time when magazines were overshadowed during the rise of paperbacks and television. The Golden Age of magazines came to an end as mass market, general interest publications gave way to special interest magazines targeting specialized audiences.

Helen Gurley Brown arrives
Cosmopolitan's circulation continued to decline for another decade until Helen Gurley Brown became chief editor in 1965 and radically changed the magazine. Brown remodeled and re-invented it as a magazine for modern single career women, completely transforming the magazine into a racy, contentious, and successful magazine. As the editor for 32 years, Brown spent this time using the magazine as an outlet to erase stigma around unmarried women not only having sex, but also enjoying it. Known as a "devout feminist", Brown was often attacked by critics due to her progressive views on women and sex. She believed that women were allowed to enjoy sex without shame in all cases. She died in 2012 at the age of 90. Her vision is still evident in the current design of Cosmopolitan Magazine. The magazine eventually adopted a cover format consisting of a usually young female model (in recent years, an actress, singer, or another prominent female celebrity), typically in a low cut dress, bikini, or some other revealing outfit.

The magazine set itself apart by frankly discussing sexuality from the point of view that women could and should enjoy sex without guilt. The first issue under Helen Gurley Brown, July 1965, featured an article on the birth control pill, which had gone on the market exactly five years earlier.

This was not Brown's first publication dealing with sexually liberated women. Her 1962 advice book, Sex and the Single Girl, had been a bestseller. Fan mail begging for Brown's advice on many subjects concerning women's behavior, sexual encounters, health, and beauty flooded her after the book was released. Brown sent the message that a woman should have men complement her life, not take it over. Enjoying sex without shame was also a message she incorporated in both publications.

In Brown's early years as editor, the magazine received heavy criticism. In 1968 at the feminist Miss America protest, protestors symbolically threw a number of feminine products into a "Freedom Trash Can." These included copies of Cosmopolitan and Playboy magazines. Cosmopolitan also ran a near-nude centerfold of actor Burt Reynolds in April 1972, causing great controversy and attracting much attention. The Latin American edition of Cosmopolitan was launched in March 1973.

In April 1978, a single edition of Cosmopolitan Man was published as a trial, targeted to appeal to men. Its cover featured Jack Nicholson and Aurore Clément. It was published twice in 1989 as a supplement to Cosmopolitan.

In its January 1988 issue, Cosmopolitan ran a feature claiming that women had almost no reason to worry about contracting HIV long after the best available medical science indicated otherwise. The piece claimed that unprotected sex with an HIV-positive man did not put women at risk of infection and went on to state that "most heterosexuals are not at risk" and that it was impossible to transmit HIV in the missionary position. This article angered many educated people, including AIDS and gay rights activists. The protests organised in response to the article's publication were turned into a 30-minute documentary titled "Doctors, Liars and Women: AIDS Activists Say NO to Cosmo" by two members of ACTUP, a New York City based collective of HIV/AIDS activists.

One of the articles in its October 1989 issue, "The Risky Business of Bisexual Love," promoted the 'bisexual bridge' theory. The bisexual bridge theory suggests that heterosexual women are unknowingly put at risk for contracting HIV through sexual contact with bisexual men who covertly have sex with other men (colloquially described as being "on the down low"). The New York Area Bisexual Network performed a successful letter-writing campaign against Cosmopolitan.

Today

The magazine, and in particular its cover stories, have become increasingly sexually explicit in tone, and covers have models wearing revealing clothes. Kroger, the second largest grocery chain in the United States after Walmart, used to cover up Cosmopolitan at checkout stands because of complaints about sexually inappropriate headlines. The UK edition of Cosmopolitan, which began in 1972, was the first Cosmopolitan magazine to be branched out to another country. It was well known for sexual explicitness, with strong sexual language, male nudity, and coverage of such subjects as rape. In 1999, CosmoGIRL!, a spinoff magazine targeting a teenage female audience, was created for international readership. It shut down in December 2008.

There are 64 worldwide editions of Cosmopolitan, and the magazine is published in 35 languages, with distribution in more than 100 countries making Cosmopolitan the largest-selling young women's magazine in the world. Some international editions are published in partnerships, such as licenses or joint ventures, with established publishing houses in each local market. In October 2018, Bauer Media Group announced that after 45 years, publication of the Australian edition of Cosmopolitan would stop due to the commercial viability of the magazine no longer being sustainable. In March 2022 the Russian edition, Cosmopolitan Russia, changed its title to Voice after Hearst revoked its affiliation following to the invasion of Ukraine.

Cosmopolitan has since the 1960s been a women's magazine discussing such topics as sex, health, fitness, and fashion. The magazine also has a section called "Ask Him Anything" where a male writer answers readers' questions about men and dating. 

Cosmopolitan has found popularity in its newfound medium, the "discover" section on Snapchat. Cosmopolitan's "discover" has over 3 million readers a day.

In its October 2018 issue, Cosmopolitan featured plus-sized model Tess Holliday on the cover. Some people, such as TV presenter Piers Morgan, criticized this choice, arguing that it amounted to promoting obesity. Editor of Cosmopolitan Farrah Storr called the cover choice a bold stance in favor of body positivity. In December 2020, actress Emma Roberts became the first pregnant celebrity to appear on the cover of the magazine.

Awards and features

Fun, Fearless Male of the Year
For over a decade, the February issue has featured this award. In 2011, Russell Brand received the magazine's Fun, Fearless Male of the Year Award, joining Kellan Lutz and Paul Wesley (2010), John Mayer (2008), Nick Lachey (2007), Patrick Dempsey (2006), Josh Duhamel (2005), Matthew Perry (2004), and Jon Bon Jovi (2003).

Fun, Fearless Female of the Year
Nicole Scherzinger received the 2012 Fun, Fearless Female of the Year honor, a title that had been previously awarded to Kayla Itsines (2015), Mila Kunis (2011), Anna Faris (2010), Ali Larter (2009), Katherine Heigl (2008), Eva Mendes (2007), Beyoncé (2006), Ashlee Simpson (2005), Alicia Silverstone (2004), Sandra Bullock (2003), Britney Spears (2002), Debra Messing (2001), Jennifer Love Hewitt (2000), Shania Twain (1999), and Ashley Judd (1998)

Cosmopolitan Men - The Making of the World's Sexiest Calendar 
Cosmopolitan Men releases a video on The Making of the World's Sexiest Calendar in 1994 followed by a stunning 14-month Cosmopolitan Men Calendar. Photographer Richard Reinsdorf shot the entire Calendar and helped direct the video.

Anniversary Male Centerfolds 
Cosmopolitan releases a Male Centerfold issue every few years that features hot male celebrities from the United States. Here is a partial list of the men that have appeared in Cosmopolitan's Centerfold Editions over the years: Burt Reynolds 1972, Jim Brown 1973, John Davidson 1975, Arnold Schwarzenegger 1977, Scott Brown 1982, David Hasselhoff 1990. Male super-model Tracy James was named Cosmopolitan's 25th Anniversary Centerfold in 1995: his centerfold garnered so much attention that Cosmo printed an extra 500,000 copies to meet demand. Cosmopolitan's Editor-in-Chief Helen Gurley Brown sat with James for interviews on America's Talking and on Oprah with Oprah Winfrey, on how the magazine's editors and scouts searched America over the course of a year, seeing thousands of men before deciding on underwear model James.

Bachelor of the Year 
Cosmopolitan'''s November issue features the hottest bachelors from all 50 states. Pictures and profiles of all the bachelors are posted on www.cosmopolitan.com, where readers view and vote for their favorite, narrowing it down to six finalists. A team of Cosmopolitan editors then selects the Bachelor of the Year, who is announced at an annual party and media event in New York. The 50 bachelors generally appear on programs such as The Today Show.

Past winners include:
 Ryan Anderson 2017
Ryan Chenevert 2012
 Chris Van Vliet 2011
 Ryan "Mickey" McLean 2010
 Brad Ludden 2008
 Brian Watkins 2007
 Matt Wood 2006

Practice Safe Sun
In the May 2006 issue of Cosmopolitan, the magazine launched the Practice Safe Sun campaign, an initiative aimed at fighting skin cancer by asking readers to stop all forms of tanning other than tanning from a bottle. In conjunction with the campaign, Cosmo's editor-in-chief, Kate White, approached Congresswoman Carolyn Maloney (D-NY), known for her support of women's health issues, with concerns that women were not fully aware of the dangers of indoor tanning and the effectiveness of the current warning labels. After careful review, the Congresswoman agreed that it was necessary to recommend that the FDA take a closer look. She and Representative Ginny Brown-Waite (R-FL) introduced the Tanning Accountability and Notification Act (TAN Act – H.R. 4767) on February 16, 2006. President Bush signed the act in September 2007, and the new federal law requires the FDA to scrutinize the warning labels on tanning beds and issue a report by September 2008.

Cosmo Blog Awards
Cosmopolitan UK launched the Cosmo Blog Awards in 2010. The awards attracted more than 15,000 entries and winning and highly commended blogs were voted for in several categories including beauty, fashion, lifestyle, and celebrity. The 2011 awards launched in August 2011 and nominations are open until August 31, 2011. All UK-based bloggers and blogs written by British bloggers abroad with a British perspective can be entered.

Cosmopolitan, The Fragrance
In May 2015, Cosmopolitan UK announced they were launching their first ever fragrance. This is considered a first in the magazine industry. Named 'Cosmopolitan, The Fragrance', the perfume takes on the notion of their much-loved phrase 'Fun, Fearless Female' and was set to launch in September.

Politics
Seventeenth AmendmentCosmopolitan played a role in passing the Seventeenth Amendment to the US Constitution, which allowed for the popular election of Senators.  In 1906, William Randolph Hearst hired David Graham Phillips to write a series of articles entitled "The Treason of the Senate." These articles, which were largely sensationalized, helped galvanize public support for this cause.

Candidate endorsement
In September 2014, Cosmopolitan began endorsing political candidates. The endorsements are based on "established criteria" agreed upon by the magazine's editors. Specifically, Cosmopolitan will only endorse candidates that support equal pay laws, legal abortion, free contraceptives, gun control, and oppose voter identification laws. Amy Odell, editor of Cosmopolitan.com, has stated that under no circumstances will the magazine endorse a political candidate that is anti-abortion: "We're not going to endorse someone who is pro-life because that's not in our readers' best interest." According to Joanna Coles, the magazine's editor-in-chief, the endorsements of Cosmopolitan will focus on "candidates in swing states or candidates who are strongly in favor of issues like contraception coverage or gun control." In the 2014 U.S. elections, Cosmopolitan officially endorsed twelve Democratic candidates. However, only two of them won their respective political campaigns.

 Campaigns against Cosmopolitan 
Victoria Hearst, a granddaughter of William Randolph Hearst (founder of Cosmopolitan's parent company) and sister of Patty Hearst, has lent her support to a campaign which seeks to classify Cosmopolitan as harmful under the guidelines of "Material Harmful to Minors" laws. Hearst, the founder of an evangelical Colorado church called Praise Him Ministries, states that "the magazine promotes a lifestyle that can be dangerous to women's emotional and physical well being. It should never be sold to anyone under 18". According to former model Nicole Weider, who is also part of this campaign, the magazine's marketing is subtly targeting children.

In 2018, Walmart announced that Cosmopolitan'' would be removed from checkout lines after the anti-pornography organization National Center on Sexual Exploitation, formerly known as Morality in Media, labeled the magazine as "sexually explicit material".

Editor in chief (American edition)

 Frank P. Smith (1886–1888)
 E. D. Walker (1888)
 John Brisben Walker (1889–1905)
 Bailey Millard (1905–1907)
 S. S. Chamberlain (1907–1908)
 C. P. Narcross (1908–1913)
 Sewell Haggard (1914)
 Edgar Grant Sisson (1914–1917)
 Douglas Z. Doty (1917–1918)
 Ray Long (1918–1931)
 Harry Payne Burton (1931–1942)
 Frances Whiting (1942–1945)
 Arthur Gordon (1946–1948)
 Herbert R. Mayes (1948–1951)
 John J. O'Connell (1951–1959)
 Robert C. Atherton (1959–1965)
 Helen Gurley Brown (1965–1997)
 Bonnie Fuller (1997–1998)
 Kate White (1998–2012)
 Joanna Coles (2012–2016)
 Michele Promaulayko (2016–2018)
 Jessica Pels (October 10, 2018 – present)

References

External links

 American History: "Cosmopolitan Magazine" at Spartacus Educational

 The Cosmopolitan at the HathiTrust
 Hearst's international combined with Cosmopolitan at the HathiTrust

1886 establishments in New York (state)
 
Fashion magazines published in the United States
Feminism in the United States
Feminist magazines
Hearst Communications publications
Literary magazines published in the United States
Magazines established in 1886
Magazines published in New York City
Modern liberal magazines published in the United States
Monthly magazines published in the United States
Political magazines published in the United States
Women's fashion magazines
Women's magazines published in the United States